Polystachya kupensis is a species of plant in the family Orchidaceae. It is endemic to Cameroon.  Its natural habitat is subtropical or tropical moist lowland forests. It is threatened by habitat loss.

References

kupensis
Endemic orchids of Cameroon
Critically endangered plants
Taxonomy articles created by Polbot